Young River God with Three Putti is a 
circa 1548 sculpture executed in marble by the mannerist artist Pierino da Vinci (c. 1529–1553/54). Today it is in the permanent collection of the Musée du Louvre in Paris. 
The work was commissioned by the Medici official and patron of the arts Luca Martini. 

Martini presented the work to Cosimo I de' Medici, Grand Duke of Tuscany's wife, Eleonora of Toledo, and she in turn to her brother, García Álvarez de Toledo y Osorio, who put it in the gardens of Santa Chiara, Naples. The statue was then at the Palazzo Balzo also in Naples before coming to the Louvre.

References

Italian sculpture
1548 in art
Renaissance sculptures
Mannerist sculptures
Italian sculptures of the Louvre